Charles Harold Evelyn-White (12 December 1850 – 7 February 1938, Felixstowe) was an English clergyman and antiquarian.

Family life
Evelyn-White married Charlotte Reid, with whom he parented Hugh Evelyn-White in 1884.

Ecclesiastic career
In 1885 he was curate of St Margaret's Church, Ipswich.
In 1894 he became rector of the Cambridgeshire village of Rampton, Cambridgeshire, a post he held until 1928.

Antiquarian activities
In 1885 Evelyn-White relaunched the East Anglian, an antiquarian journal which was a revival of an earlier journal, The East Anglian Notes and Queries, founded by Samuel Tymms in 1858 under the auspices of the Suffolk Institute of Archaeology. Evelyn-White was involved with the Cambridge Antiquarian Society until  1900, when he had a disagreement with them; he then established the Cambridgeshire & Huntingdonshire Archaeological Society largely by himself.

In 1930 he retired to Felixstowe, where he died at Wolsey Gardens in 1938.

References

1850 births
1938 deaths
19th-century English Anglican priests
20th-century English Anglican priests
English antiquarians